Atacamichthys is an extinct genus of ray-finned fish. It contains one species, Atacamichthys greeni, which lived in what is now Chile during the Oxfordian stage of the Late Jurassic epoch. Atacamichthys is the only member of the family Atacamichthyidae.

References

Prehistoric teleostei
Prehistoric ray-finned fish genera
Oxfordian genera
Late Jurassic bony fish
Jurassic fish of South America
Jurassic Chile
Fossils of Chile
Fossil taxa described in 1987